The Taylorcraft Model D is a light aircraft of the US manufacturer Taylorcraft Aviation from the early 1940s.

History
In the years 1940-41, the demand for training machines increased steadily, especially in the semi-military pilot training program (Civilian Pilot Training, CPT). Although Taylorcraft was able to sell a larger number of the Model B to United States Army Air Corps (USAAC) as part of the program, versions with consecutive seats were considered more appropriate. So in 1940, half of all machines used for this purpose came from Piper, which the J-3 could offer with this seating arrangement. To better capture this market, Taylorcraft developed the Model D, which again took up the tandem seat layout of the earlier Taylor J-2. After the construction of 200 machines, the production was converted to the military version L-2.

The first version was the DC-65, which was publicly presented in February 1941 and received the Type Approval on November 25, 1941. The standard engine was the Continental A65-8, but a Franklin 4AC-176 (DF-65) or a Lycoming O-145-B2 (DL-65) could also be installed. To identify the equipment with single or dual ignition, the letters S or D have been relocated (eg DL-65S for single-ignition and DL-65D for dual-ignition). The dimensions differed only slightly from those of the model B, only the span was reduced by about 18 cm due to the narrower cabin and the length was increased by 23 cm.

Construction
As with all pre-war Taylorcraft aircraft, the fuselage structure consisted of welded steel tubing, covered in fabric. Taylorcraft tried to utilise as many parts of the Model B as possible, however, this was only partially successful, as the main structural components were not interchangeable between the two patterns and the wing ribs were made of aluminum instead of wood. Because of the anticipated heavier load in the training operation, the airframe also received reinforcements. The tanks were in the wings and fed a collection tank behind the engine. The engine was enclosed in a partial cowling leaving the cylinder heads uncovered in the air flow. The machine could be flown from either seat.

In the specifications of the designers John Hutmacher and Cameron Lusty was the requirement for a good all-round visibility, whereupon they lowered the upper strap of the trunk compartment (Longeron) at shoulder level of the pilot. When C.G. Taylor saw the first specimen in this form, he ordered it to be undone to restore the typical outward appearance of a Taylorcraft machine. The designers did this by placing a plywood fitting on the upper Longeron. In the later military version L-2A, this "turtle hump" was then removed and replaced by a transparent cladding.

Variants
DC  Continental A65
DF  Franklin 4AC
DL  Lycoming O-145
Auster AOP Mk.I  Cirrus Major.
Auster AOP Mk.II  Cirrus Major.
Auster AOP Mk.III  Cirrus Major.
Auster AOP Mk.IV Lycoming O-290.
Auster AOP Mk.V Lycoming O-290.
O-57 Original designation, re-designated as L-2 in the Liaison series.
L-2L-2A with open cowling, L-2M with closed cowling.

Specifications (DC)

See also 
 List of aircraft types

References

Further reading
  Taylorcraft - A Complex Classic . In: AIR Enthusiast

D
Single-engined tractor aircraft
Aircraft first flown in 1941